Laukesoo Nature Reserve is a nature reserve which is located in Harju County, Estonia.

The area of the nature reserve is 2556 ha.

The protected area was founded in 1981 on the basis of Laukesoo Wetland Conservation Area.

References

Nature reserves in Estonia
Geography of Harju County